Orshanka (Örša) is an urban locality (an urban-type settlement) and the administrative center of Orshansky District of the Mari El Republic, Russia. As of the 2010 Census, its population was 6,589.

Administrative and municipal status
Within the framework of administrative divisions, Orshanka serves as the administrative center of Orshansky District. As an administrative division, the urban-type settlement of Orshanka is incorporated within Orshansky District as Orshanka Urban-Type Settlement (an administrative division of the district). As a municipal division, Orshanka Urban-Type Settlement is incorporated within Orshansky Municipal District as Orshanka Urban Settlement.

References

Notes

Sources

Urban-type settlements in the Mari El Republic
